Louis Verstraete (born 4 May 1999) is a Belgian professional footballer who plays as a midfielder for Beveren.

Club career

Gent
In 2016, Verstraete signed a contract until 2018 with K.A.A. Gent's first team. On 22 December 2016, he made his senior team debut in the Belgian First Division A against Anderlecht, replacing Jérémy Perbet in the 83rd minute. On 16 March 2017, he scored his first senior goal for Gent in the UEFA Europa League round of 16 return game at Genk, making him the youngest goal scorer of that season's competition.

Loan to Waasland-Beveren 
In December 2018, Verstraete moved to Belgium side Waasland-Beveren, on a loan deal until the end of the season.

Royal Antwerp 
In January 2020, Verstraete signed a contract for 3.5 years with Jupiler Pro League club Royal Antwerp, and was loaned to KV Oostende for the first six months.

Loan to Waasland-Beveren (second stint) 
In January 2021, Verstraete moved again on loan to Waasland-Beveren, until the end of the season. The loan deal includes a purchase option. On 18 April 2021, Verstraete became match winner for Waasland-Beveren in a crucial must-win match against Oud-Heverlee Leuven, in which he scored two goals to help the club avoid direct relegation.

Career statistics

References

External links

Living people
1999 births
Belgian footballers
Belgium youth international footballers
Association football midfielders
K.A.A. Gent players
Royal Antwerp F.C. players
K.V. Oostende players
Belgian Pro League players
Challenger Pro League players
S.K. Beveren players